Bogalinac (Serbian Cyrillic: Богалинац) is a village in Central Serbia (Šumadija), in the municipality of Rekovac (Region of Levač), lying at , at the elevation of 375 m. According to the 2002 census, the village had an estimated 163 residents.

External links
 Levac Online
 Article about Bogalinac
 Pictures.

Populated places in Pomoravlje District
Šumadija